Naoki Kurita (born October 15, 1971) is a Japanese sport shooter. He competed in rifle shooting events at the Summer Olympics in 1996 and 2000.

Olympic results

References

1971 births
Living people
ISSF rifle shooters
Japanese male sport shooters
Olympic shooters of Japan
Shooters at the 1996 Summer Olympics
Shooters at the 2000 Summer Olympics
Asian Games medalists in shooting
Asian Games bronze medalists for Japan
Shooters at the 1998 Asian Games
Medalists at the 1998 Asian Games
20th-century Japanese people